The Gileyli mosque or Jomard Garay mosque is a historical mosque of 14th century located on Mirza Mansur street in the Old City of Baku in Azerbaijan. The building was  registered as a national architectural monument by the Cabinet of Ministers of the Republic of Azerbaijan on August 2, 2001, No. 132.

History
Gileyli mosque was constructed in two stages: in 1309, during the Shirvanshahs period, and in the second half of the 19th century. Originally, the mosque once had doors made of walnut tree, but it was burned and replaced.

Architectural features
The old part has a cruciform-dome composition.  arms of the cruciform are deep domes; at the corners small rooms are placed. The Mihrab with accurate proportion, profiled and decorated with architectural elements and details enriches the interior of the worshipping hall, which differs with its rigidness and tectonics of voluminous masses. The new section built in the 19th century does not affect the integrity of the scheme, but expanding the convenience. Its pointed-form dome repeats formed architectural atmosphere of the place, and becomes an integral part of the composition structure. Here are implemented new elements of European architectural composition. It's vividly seen on the structure of the facade.

Gallery

See also
Jinn Mosque
Sheikh Ibrahim Mosque 
Sayyid Yahya Murtuza Mosque
Haji Heybat Mosque

References

Monuments and memorials in Azerbaijan
Mosques in Baku
Museums in Azerbaijan
Icherisheher